James Maryanski, was the Biotechnology Coordinator for the Food and Drug Administration's Center for Food Safety and Applied Nutrition.  He began working for the FDA in 1977 and became acting Coordinator for biotechnology policy in 1986.

Education
Maryanski received a BSc in microbiology from Ohio State University, in 1965 after which he was briefly employed by the US Public Health Service in Ohio. Maryanski received a PhD in 1972 from the University of New Hampshire where he had studied microbiology, molecular biology, and marine science.

He then spent four years at the National Institute for Dental Research, of the National Institutes of Health, investigating carbohydrate transport and cell adhesion in dental micro-organisms. Dr Maryanski regularly serves as an expert consultant on food biotechnology representing the FDA in varying capacities.

Awards
He has received the FDA Commissioner's Special Citation and Commendable Service Awards for his work in food biotechnology.

References

External links
 2001 PBS Interview with Jim Maryanski
 Transcript of 1999 Testimony before Congress on GMO safety, Video on C-SPAN
 FDA Oral History Interview, 2006

Living people
Ohio State University College of Arts and Sciences alumni
Food and Drug Administration people
American food scientists
Year of birth missing (living people)